Estaleiros Navais de Viana do Castelo (ENVC) is a medium-sized shipyard in business since 1944, located in the town of Viana do Castelo, on the Atlantic Coast in the very north of Portugal. Occupying an area of 400,000 square metres and employing 625 people, it is a major Portuguese shipbuilder. In 2013 its assets and operations are sub-licensed to Martifer (West Sea Shipyard).

History 
The shipyards were funded in June 1944 as a private limited liability company with a capital of 750,000$00 escudos by a group of technicians and workers from the shipyards of the port of Lisbon. Two of the first investors were Vasco D'Orey and João Alves Cerqueira, from the cod fishing industry. Its creation was part of a Portuguese government program to modernize the national fishing fleet.

In 1948 the company delivered its first three ships, all fishing trawlers for cod fishing: Senhor dos Mareantes and Senhora das Candeias were delivered to the company Empresa de Pesca de Viana, and São Gonçalinho to the company Empresa de Pesca de Aveiro.

In May 1949, the ENVC were constituted as an anonymous society with a PTE 37,000,000$00 capital. in 1950 the company H. Parry & Son, Lda. became the main shareholder and in 1971 the CUF group took over as the major shareholder.

In 1975, following the Carnation Revolution the previous year, the shipyards were nationalized and became a state-owned company with a capital of PTE 330,000,000$00. In 1987 its capital was changed to 3 million contos.

In 1991 the company was made an anonymous society with the Portuguese government remaining the major shareholder.

Since the early years Viana shipyard has developed its own design and had the capacity to design, build, convert and repair different sophisticated and specialized ships.

Up to the present, the yard has delivered more than 200 vessels including barges, tugboats, ferry boats, fishing vessels, general cargo and bulk carriers, container ships, oil and chemical tankers, LPG's, cement carriers and war vessels.

See also 
 Shipbuilding
 EMPORDEF
 Martifer
 Viana do Castelo-class patrol vessel
 List of shipbuilders and shipyards
 Arsenal do Alfeite
 Portuguese Navy

References

External links 
 ENVC, official website
 ENVC Subconcessão, EMPORDEF campaign website regarding the sub-licensing

Shipyards of Portugal